In parallel algorithms, the list ranking problem involves determining the position, or rank, of each item in a linked list. That is, the first item in the list should be assigned the number 1, the second item in the list should be assigned the number 2, etc. Although it is straightforward to solve this problem efficiently on a sequential computer, by traversing the list in order, it is more complicated to solve in parallel. As  wrote, the problem was viewed as important in the parallel algorithms community both for its many applications and because solving it led to many important ideas that could be applied in parallel algorithms more generally.

History
Over a sequence of many subsequent papers, this was eventually improved to linearly many steps (O(n/log n) processors), on the most restrictive model of synchronous shared-memory parallel computation, the exclusive read exclusive write PRAM. This number of steps matches the sequential algorithm.

Related problems
List ranking can equivalently be viewed as performing a prefix sum operation on the given list, in which the values to be summed are all equal to one. The list ranking problem can be used to solve many problems on trees via an Euler tour technique, in which one forms a linked list that includes two copies of each edge of the tree, one in each direction, places the nodes of this list into an ordered array using list ranking, and then performs prefix sum computations on the ordered array . For instance, the height of each node in the tree may be computed by an algorithm of this type in which the prefix sum adds 1 for each downward edge and subtracts 1 for each upward edge.

References
.
.
.
.
.

Parallel computing